New Jersey elected its members November 2, 1824.

See also 
 1824 and 1825 United States House of Representatives elections
 List of United States representatives from New Jersey

1824
New Jersey
United States House of Representatives